The 7th constituency of the Pas-de-Calais is a French legislative constituency in the Pas-de-Calais département.

Description

Pas-de-Calais' 7th constituency includes the whole of the port city of Calais.

Until 2017, the constituency consistently elected candidates from the Socialist Party with the exception of conservative landslide in 1993. Yann Capet's father, André Capet also represented the seat, holding it until his death in 2000.

Historic Representation

Election results

2022

 
 
 
 
 
 
|-
| colspan="8" bgcolor="#E9E9E9"|
|-

2017

2012

 
 
 
 
 
 
|-
| colspan="8" bgcolor="#E9E9E9"|
|-

2007

 
 
 
 
 
 
 
 
 
|-
| colspan="8" bgcolor="#E9E9E9"|
|-

2002

 
 
 
 
 
 
 
 
|-
| colspan="8" bgcolor="#E9E9E9"|
|-

1997

Sources
 Official results of French elections from 1998: 

7